Citharinus citharus is a species of lutefish from tropical Africa.

References

Characiformes
Fish of Africa
Taxa named by Étienne Geoffroy Saint-Hilaire
Fish described in 1809